"What the Cowgirls Do" is a song co-written and recorded by American country music artist Vince Gill.  It was released in July 1994 as the second single from the album When Love Finds You.  The song reached number 2 on the Billboard Hot Country Singles & Tracks chart.  It was written by Gill and Reed Nielsen.

Critical reception
Deborah Evans Price, of Billboard magazine reviewed the song favorably saying that it contains an "effortless groove and Gill's snappy Telecaster licks."

Music video
The music video was directed by John Lloyd Miller and premiered in July 1994. It featured appearances by Calvert DeForest, Little Jimmy Dickens and Rodney Crowell.

Personnel
Compiled from the liner notes.
Stuart Duncan – fiddle
Vince Gill – lead and backing vocals, electric guitar, electric guitar solo
John Barlow Jarvis – keyboards
Tom Roady – percussion
Randy Scruggs – acoustic guitar
Steuart Smith – electric guitar
Billy Thomas – backing vocals
Carlos Vega – drums
Pete Wasner – piano
Willie Weeks – bass guitar

Chart performance
"What the Cowgirls Do" debuted at number 71 on the U.S. Billboard Hot Country Singles & Tracks for the week of July 9, 1994.

Year-end charts

References

Songs about cowboys and cowgirls
1994 singles
Vince Gill songs
Songs written by Vince Gill
Song recordings produced by Tony Brown (record producer)
MCA Records singles
Music videos directed by John Lloyd Miller
Songs written by Reed Nielsen
1994 songs